Les Montils is a commune in the Loir-et-Cher department of central France.

Geography
Les Montils is at the edge of the Sologne, at an altitude of 80 m (approx.). This town is bordered by the Cosson in the north, through the Beuvron. To the west of the village, the Bièvre flows into Beuvron. At this point, there are numerous beavers.

Tourism
 Recreation area Masnières
 A model railway with a train that can be ridden by visitors in the summer months.

Sights
 From the old village remains a strong tower, the tower of Montils, an arch and some walls.
 Château de Frileuse

Agriculture
 Wine : Cheverny, AOC

Population

Personalities
Antonio de La Gandara (1861–1917), painter

See also
Communes of the Loir-et-Cher department

References

Communes of Loir-et-Cher